The Dudek Action is a Polish single-place, paraglider that was designed and produced by Dudek Paragliding of Bydgoszcz. It is now out of production.

Design and development
The Action was designed as an advanced and competition glider and made from Skytex material with Technora lines. The models are each named for their relative size.

Operational history
Reviewer Noel Bertrand described the Action in a 2003 review as "technically very elaborate".

Variants
Action M
Medium-sized model for mid-weight pilots. The glider model is AFNOR Performance certified.
Action L
Large-sized model for heavier-weight pilots. The glider model is AFNOR Performance certified.
Action XL
Extra large-sized model for even heavier pilots.

Specifications (Action L)

References

External links

Action
Paragliders